The Department of Labor and Immigration was an Australian government department that existed between June 1974 and December 1975.

History
When the Department of Labor and Immigration was formed by the Whitlam Government in June 1974, it represented a merger of the Department of Labour and the Department of Immigration.

Scope
Information about the department's functions and/or government funding allocation could be found in the Administrative Arrangements Orders, the annual Portfolio Budget Statements and in the Department's annual reports.

At its creation, the Department's functions were:
Industrial relations, including conciliation and arbitration in relation to industrial disputes;
Commonwealth Employment Service 
Reinstatement in civil employment of national servicemen, members of the Reserve Forces and members of the Citizen Forces 
Assisted migration; and 
Naturalisation, citizenship and aliens.

Structure
The Department was a Commonwealth Public Service department, staffed by officials who were responsible to the Minister for Labor and Immigration.

References

Ministries established in 1974
Labor and Immigration
1974 establishments in Australia